Sulfur assimilation is the process by which living organisms incorporate sulfur into their biological molecules. In plants, sulfate is absorbed by the roots and then be transported to the chloroplasts by the transipration stream where the sulfur are reduced to sulfide with the help of a series of enzymatic reactions. Furthermore, the reduced sulfur is incorporated into cysteine, an amino acid that is a precursor to many other sulfur-containing compounds. In animals, sulfur assimilation occurs primarily through the diet, as animals cannot produce sulfur-containing compounds directly. Sulfur is incorporated into amino acids such as cysteine and methionine, which are used to build proteins and other important molecules. Besides, With the rapid development of economy, the increase emission of sulfur results in environmental issues, such as acid rain and hydrogen sulfilde.

Sulfate uptake by plants

Sulfate is taken up by the roots that have high affinity. The maximal sulfate uptake rate is generally already reached at sulfate levels of 0.1 mM and lower. The uptake of sulfate by the roots and its transport to the shoot is strictly controlled and it appears to be one of the primary regulatory sites of sulfur assimilation.

Sulfate is actively taken up across the plasma membrane of the root cells, subsequently loaded into the xylem vessels and transported to the shoot by the transpiration stream. The uptake and transport of sulfate is energy dependent (driven by a proton gradient generated by ATPases) through a proton/sulfate co-transport. In the shoot the sulfate is unloaded and transported to the chloroplasts where it is reduced. The remaining sulfate in plant tissue is predominantly present in the vacuole, since the concentration of sulfate in the cytoplasm is kept rather constant.

Distinct sulfate transporter proteins mediate the uptake, transport and subcellular distribution of sulfate. According to their cellular and subcellular gene expression, and possible functioning the sulfate transporters gene family has been classified in up to 5 different groups. Some groups are expressed exclusively in the roots or shoots or expressed both in the roots and shoots.

 Group 1 are 'high affinity sulfate transporters', which are involved in the uptake of sulfate by the roots. 
 Group 2 are vascular transporters and are 'low affinity sulfate transporters'.
 Group 3 is the so-called 'leaf group', however, still little is known about the characteristics of this group. 
 Group 4 transporters are involved in the efflux of sulfate from the vacuoles, whereas the function of Group 5 sulfate transporters is not known yet, and likely function only as molybdate transporters.

Regulation and expression of the majority of sulfate transporters are controlled by the sulfur nutritional status of the plants. Upon sulfate deprivation, the rapid decrease in root sulfate is regularly accompanied by a strongly enhanced expression of most sulfate transporter genes (up to 100-fold), accompanied by a substantially enhanced sulfate uptake capacity. The nature of these transporters is not yet fully solved, whether sulfate itself or metabolic products of the sulfur assimilation (O-acetylserine, cysteine, glutathione) act as signals in the regulation of sulfate uptake by the root and its transport to the shoot, and in the expression of the sulfate transporters involved.

Sulfate reduction in plants
Even though root plastids contain all sulfate reduction enzymes, sulfate reduction predominantly takes place in the leaf chloroplasts. The reduction of sulfate to sulfide occurs in three steps. Sulfate needs to be activated to adenosine 5'-phosphosulfate (APS) prior to its reduction to sulfite.

The activation of sulfate is catalyzed by ATP sulfurylase, which affinity for sulfate is rather low (Km approximately 1 mM) and the in situ sulfate concentration in the chloroplast is most likely one of the limiting/regulatory steps in sulfur reduction. Subsequently, APS is reduced to sulfite, catalyzed by APS reductase with likely glutathione as reductant.

The latter reaction is assumed to be one of the primary regulation points in the sulfate reduction, since the activity of APS reductase is the lowest of the enzymes of the sulfate reduction pathway and it has a fast turnover rate. Sulfite is with high affinity reduced by sulfite reductase to sulfide with ferredoxin as a reductant. The remaining sulfate in plant tissue is transferred into the vacuole. The remobilization and redistribution of the vacuolar sulfate reserves appear to be rather slow and sulfur-deficient plants may still contain detectable levels of sulfate.

Synthesis and function of sulfur compounds in plants

Cysteine
Sulfide is incorporated into cysteine, catalyzed by O-acetylserine (thiol)lyase, with O-acetylserine as substrate. The synthesis of O-acetylserine is catalyzed by serine acetyltransferase and together with O-acetylserine (thiol)lyase it is associated as enzyme complex named cysteine synthase.

The formation of cysteine is the direct coupling step between sulfur (sulfur metabolism) and nitrogen assimilation in plants. This differs from the process in yeast, where sulfide must be incorporated first in homocysteine then converted in two steps to cysteine.

Cysteine is sulfur donor for the synthesis of methionine, the major other sulfur-containing amino acid present in plants. This happens through the transsulfuration pathway and the methylation of homocysteine.

Both cysteine and methionine are sulfur-containing amino acids and are of great significance in the structure, conformation and function of proteins and enzymes, but high levels of these amino acids may also be present in seed storage proteins. The thiol groups of the cysteine residues in proteins can be oxidized resulting in disulfide bridges with other cysteine side chains (and form cystine) and/or linkage of polypeptides.

Disulfide bridges (disulfide bonds) make an important contribution to the structure of proteins. The thiol groups are also of great importance in substrate binding of enzymes, in metal-sulfur clusters in proteins (e.g. ferredoxins) and in regulatory proteins (e.g. thioredoxins).

Glutathione

Glutathione or its homologues, e.g. homoglutathione in Fabaceae; hydroxymethylglutathione in Poaceae are the major water-soluble non-protein thiol compounds present in plant tissue and account for 1-2% of the total sulfur. The content of glutathione in plant tissue ranges from 0.1 - 3 mM. Cysteine is the direct precursor for the synthesis of glutathione (and its homologues). First, γ-glutamylcysteine is synthesized from cysteine and glutamate catalyzed by gamma-glutamylcysteine synthetase. Second, glutathione is synthesized from γ-glutamylcysteine and glycine (in glutathione homologues, β-alanine or serine) catalyzed by glutathione synthetase. Both steps of the synthesis of glutathione are ATP dependent reactions. Glutathione is maintained in the reduced form by an NADPH-dependent glutathione reductase and the ratio of reduced glutathione (GSH) to oxidized glutathione (GSSG) generally exceeds a value of 7.
Glutathione fulfils various roles in plant functioning. In sulfur metabolism it functions as reductant in the reduction of APS to sulfite. It is also the major transport form of reduced sulfur in plants. Roots likely largely depend for their reduced sulfur supply on shoot/root transfer of glutathione via the phloem, since the reduction of sulfur occurs predominantly in the chloroplast. Glutathione is directly involved in the reduction and assimilation of selenite into selenocysteine. Furthermore, glutathione is of great significance in the protection of plants against oxidative and environmental stress and it depresses/scavenges the formation of toxic reactive oxygen species, e.g. superoxide, hydrogen peroxide and lipid hydroperoxides. Glutathione functions as reductant in the enzymatic detoxification of reactive oxygen species in the glutathione-ascorbate cycle and as thiol buffer in the protection of proteins via direct reaction with reactive oxygen species or by the formation of mixed disulfides. The potential of glutathione as protectant is related to the pool size of glutathione, its redox state (GSH/GSSG ratio) and the activity of glutathione reductase. Glutathione is the precursor for the synthesis of phytochelatins, which are synthesized enzymatically by a constitutive phytochelatin synthase. The number of γ-glutamyl-cysteine residues in the phytochelatins may range from 2 - 5, sometimes up to 11. Despite the fact that the phytochelatins form complexes which a few heavy metals, viz. cadmium, it is assumed that these compounds play a role in heavy metal homeostasis and detoxification by buffering of the cytoplasmatic concentration of essential heavy metals. Glutathione is also involved in the detoxification of xenobiotics, compounds without direct nutritional value or significance in metabolism, which at too high levels may negatively affect plant functioning. Xenobiotics may be detoxified in conjugation reactions with glutathione catalyzed by glutathione S-transferase, which activity is constitutive; different xenobiotics may induce distinct isoforms of the enzyme. Glutathione S-transferases have great significance in herbicide detoxification and tolerance in agriculture and their induction by herbicide antidotes ('safeners') is the decisive step for the induction of herbicide tolerance in many crop plants. Under natural conditions glutathione S-transferases are assumed to have significance in the detoxification of lipid hydroperoxides, in the conjugation of endogenous metabolites, hormones and DNA degradation products, and in the transport of flavonoids.

Sulfolipids

Sulfolipids are sulfur containing lipids. Sulfoquinovosyl diacylglycerols are the predominant sulfolipids present in plants. In leaves its content comprises up to 3 - 6% of the total sulfur present. This sulfolipid is present in plastid membranes and likely is involved in chloroplast functioning. The route of biosynthesis and physiological function of sulfoquinovosyl diacylglycerol is still under investigation. From recent studies it is evident that sulfite it the likely sulfur precursor for the formation of the sulfoquinovose group of this lipid.

Secondary sulfur compounds
Brassica species contain glucosinolates, which are sulfur-containing secondary compounds. Glucosinolates are composed of a β-thioglucose moiety, a sulfonated oxime and a side chain. The synthesis of glucosinolates starts with the oxidation of the parent amino acid to an aldoxime, followed by the addition of a thiol group (through conjugation with glutathione) to produce thiohydroximate. The transfer of a glucose and a sulfate moiety completes the formation of the glucosinolates.

The physiological significance of glucosinolates is still ambiguous, though they are considered to function as sink compounds in situations of sulfur excess. Upon tissue disruption glucosinolates are enzymatically degraded by myrosinase and may yield a variety of biologically active products such as isothiocyanates, thiocyanates, nitriles and oxazolidine-2-thiones. The glucosinolate-myrosinase system is assumed to play a role in plant-herbivore and plant-pathogen interactions.

Furthermore, glucosinolates are responsible for the flavor properties of Brassicaceae and recently 
have received attention in view of their potential anti-carcinogenic properties.
Allium species contain γ-glutamylpeptides and alliins (S-alk(en)yl cysteine sulfoxides). The content of these sulfur-containing secondary compounds strongly depends on stage of development of the plant, temperature, water availability and the level of nitrogen and sulfur nutrition. In onion bulbs their content may account for up to 80% of the organic sulfur fraction. Less is known about the content of secondary sulfur compounds in the seedling stage of the plant.

It is assumed that alliins are predominantly synthesized in the leaves, from where they are subsequently transferred to the attached bulb scale. The biosynthetic pathways of synthesis of γ-glutamylpeptides and alliins are still ambiguous. γ-Glutamylpeptides can be formed from cysteine (via γ-glutamylcysteine or glutathione) and can be metabolized into the corresponding alliins via oxidation and subsequent hydrolyzation by γ-glutamyl transpeptidases.

However, other possible routes of the synthesis of γ-glutamylpeptides and alliins may not be excluded. Alliins and γ-glutamylpeptides are known to have therapeutic utility and might have potential value as phytopharmaceutics. The alliins and their breakdown products (e.g. allicin) are the flavor precursors for the odor and taste of species. Flavor is only released when plant cells are disrupted and the enzyme alliinase from the vacuole is able to degrade the alliins, yielding a wide variety of volatile and non-volatile sulfur-containing compounds. The physiological function of γ-glutamylpeptides and alliins is rather unclear.

Sulfur assimilation in animal 
Unlike in plants, animals do not have a pathway for the direct assimilation of inorganic sulfate into organic compounds. In animals, the primary source of sulfur is dietary methionine, an essential amino acid that contains a sulfur atom. Methionine is first converted to S-adenosylmethionine (SAM), a compound that is involved in many important biological processes, including DNA methylation and neurotransmitter synthesis.

SAM can then be used to synthesize other important sulfur-containing compounds such as cysteine, taurine, and glutathione. Cysteine is a precursor for the synthesis of several important proteins and peptides, as well as glutathione, a powerful antioxidant that protects cells from oxidative stress. Taurine is involved in a variety of physiological processes, including osmoregulation, modulation of calcium signaling, and regulation of mitochondrial function.

Sulfur assimiation in microorganisms 
In bacteria and fungi, the sulfur assimilation pathway is similar to that in plants, where inorganic sulfate is reduced to sulfide, and then incorporated into cysteine and other sulfur-containing compounds.

Bacteria and fungi can absorb inorganic sulfate from the environment through a sulfate transporter, which is regulated by the presence of sulfate in the medium. Once inside the cell, sulfate is activated by ATP sulfurylase to form adenosine 5'-phosphosulfate (APS), which is then reduced to sulfite by APS reductase. Sulfite is further reduced to sulfide by sulfite reductase, which is then incorporated into cysteine by enzyme.

Cysteine, once synthesized, can be used for the biosynthesis of methionine and other important biomolecules. In addition, microorganisms also use sulfur-containing compounds for various other purposes, such as the synthesis of antibiotics.

Sulfur assimilation in microorganisms is regulated by a variety of environmental factors, including the availability of sulfur in the medium and the presence of other nutrients. The activity of key enzymes in the sulfur assimilation pathway is also regulated by feedback inhibition from downstream products, similar to the regulation seen in plants.

Sulfur metabolism in plants and air pollution 
The rapid economic growth, industrialization and urbanization are associated with a strong increase in energy demand and emissions of air pollutants including sulfur dioxide (see also acid rain) and hydrogen sulfide, which may affect plant metabolism. Sulfur gases are potentially phytotoxic, however, they may also be metabolized and used as sulfur source and even be beneficial if the sulfur fertilization of the roots is not sufficient.

Plant shoots form a sink for atmospheric sulfur gases, which can directly be taken up by the foliage (dry deposition). The foliar uptake of sulfur dioxide is generally directly dependent on the degree of opening of the stomates, since the internal resistance to this gas is low. Sulfite is highly soluble in the apoplastic water of the mesophyll, where it dissociates under formation of bisulfite and sulfite.

Sulfite may directly enter the sulfur reduction pathway and be reduced to sulfide, incorporated into cysteine, and subsequently into other sulfur compounds. Sulfite may also be oxidized to sulfate, extra- and intracellularly by peroxidases or non-enzymatically catalyzed by metal ions or superoxide radicals and subsequently reduced and assimilated again. Excessive sulfate is transferred into the vacuole; enhanced foliar sulfate levels are characteristic for exposed plants.
The foliar uptake of hydrogen sulfide appears to be directly dependent on the rate of its metabolism into cysteine and subsequently into other sulfur compounds. There is strong evidence that O-acetyl-serine (thiol)lyase is directly responsible for the active fixation of atmospheric hydrogen sulfide by plants.

Plants are able to transfer from sulfate to foliar absorbed atmospheric sulfur as sulfur source and levels of 60 ppb or higher appear to be sufficient to cover the sulfur requirement of plants. There is an interaction between atmospheric and pedospheric sulfur utilization. For instance, hydrogen sulfide exposure may result in a decreased activity of APS reductase and a depressed sulfate uptake.

See also
 Plant nutrition
 Sulfonucleotide reductase
 Sulfur metabolism

References 
Schnug, E. (1998) Sulfur in Agroecosystems. Kluwer Academic Publishers, Dordrecht, 221 pp, .
Grill, D., Tausz, M. and De Kok, L.J. (2001) Significance of Glutathione to Plant Adaptation to the Environment. Kluwer Academic Publishers, Dordrecht, .
Abrol Y.P. and Ahmad A. (2003) Sulphur in Plants. Kluwer Academic Publishers, Dordrecht, .
Saito, K., De Kok, L.J., Stulen, I., Hawkesford, M.J., Schnug, E., Sirko, A. and Rennenberg, H. (2005) Sulfur Transport and Assimilation in Plants in the Post Genomic Era. Backhuys Publishers, Leiden, .
Hawkesford, M.J. and De Kok, L.J. (2006) Managing sulfur metabolism in plants. Plant Cell and Environment 29: 382-395.

Agronomy
Biology and pharmacology of chemical elements
Metabolism
Molecular biology
Physiology
Plant physiology
Sulfur
Sulfur metabolism